Moussonvilliers is a former commune in the Orne department in north-western France. On 1 January 2018, it was merged into the new commune of Charencey.

Pierre Laval, who served as the Prime Minister of France from 1942 to 1944, purchased the Domaine de la Corbière for 400,000 French francs in 1923, where he raised cattle and bred horses.

See also
Communes of the Orne department

References

Former communes of Orne